Vaxis – Act II: A Window of the Waking Mind is the tenth studio album by American progressive rock band Coheed and Cambria. The album, like most of the studio albums from the band, is a concept album that continues the Amory Wars storyline. It was released on June 24, 2022.

Writing and recording 
Work on the album traces back to 2019; in May 2020, frontman Claudio Sanchez stated that approximately 75% of the album had been written. Sanchez noted that while he had the general concept of the album's story outlined, he was struggling with some of its themes in the wake of the breakout of the COVID-19 pandemic. He recounted starting a song called "Hallelujah Quarantine" in September 2019  that was themed around a criminal organization that misused voluntary quarantines to steal from people, a concept that, when written, seemed harmless, but upon the onset of COVID-19 lockdowns and controversies around them, seemed problematic or could be misconstrued. The album was produced by Claudio Sanchez and Zakk Cervini.

Themes and composition
The album is a concept album that furthers the story established in most of the band's prior studio albums, The Amory Wars. It is the second part of a five chapter story arc, described by the band as "a couple on the run from tyrannical forces and their mysterious new addition". Musically, Sanchez noted the band emphasized working without limitations and taking risks rather than "just giving the fans what they want", something he felt veteran bands sometimes fall into later into their careers.

In addition to furthering the story concept, Sanchez has stated that several of the songs were inspired by the COVID-19 pandemic, during which the album was recorded. In particular the songs explore the challenges of living through quarantines and lockdowns ("Comatose", "A Disappearing Act", "Love Murder One", "The Liars Club"). Other songs were inspired by the murder of George Floyd ("Ladders of Supremacy") and Sanchez's relationships with his son ("Blood", "Rise, Naianasha (Cut the Cord)") and wife ("Our Love").

Release and promotion
The album's name, track list, and initial release date of May 27 was first announced in January 2022. In April 2022, the band announced they were delaying the release a month to June 24 due to China's COVID lockdown causing supply chain disruptions, making the vinyl release impossible for the original date. The album is the band's first since Vaxis – Act I: The Unheavenly Creatures in 2018, the band's longest gap of their career. The album's deluxe edition features a 96 page hardcover novel "A Window of the Waking Mind" that ties into the album's concept, written by Sanchez and his wife Chondra Echert. Singles "Shoulders" and "Rise, Naianasha (Cut the Cord)" were released well ahead of the album in 2021, along with accompanying music videos. Further singles "The Liars Club" and "Comatose" were released in 2022 ahead of the album's release. To promote the album, the band went on the headlining "Great Destroyer" tour with Sheer Mag prior to its release, and headlined the A Window of the Waking Mind Tour in summer 2022 alongside Alkaline Trio and Mothica.

Critical reception

Vaxis – Act II: A Window of the Waking Mind was released to critical acclaim from contemporary music critics.

Track listing

Personnel

Coheed and Cambria

 Claudio Sanchez – vocals, guitar, piano, synthesizer, production
 Travis Stever – guitar
 Josh Eppard – drums
 Zach Cooper – bass

Additional musicians

 Christopher Jahnke – orchestral arrangements, orchestration
 Atlas Hendrix Sanchez – guest vocals
 Taylor Williams – programming

Technical

 Zakk Cervini – production, mixing, engineering
 Chris Athens – mastering
 Nik Trekov – engineering, editing, mixing assistance
 Jon Lundin – edit engineering

Artwork

 Chase Stone

Charts

References

2022 albums
Coheed and Cambria albums
Roadrunner Records albums
Science fiction concept albums
The Amory Wars